is a 2011 Japanese action film directed by Shimako Satō. It is a sequel to Unfair: The Movie, and was followed by Unfair: The End in 2015. The three films are based on the Japanese television drama Unfair.

Cast
Ryoko Shinohara
Kōichi Satō
Takayuki Yamada
Sadao Abe
Masaya Kato
Mitsuru Fukikoshi
Nao Ōmori
Susumu Terajima
Teruyuki Kagawa

Reception
It was number 1 at the Japanese box office on the week ending on September 18 and again (according to Kogyo Tsushinsha) on the following week. As of September 25 it has grossed US$13,809,812. The film grossed  at the Japanese box office.

References

External links
  
 

2011 action films
2011 films
Films based on television series
Films directed by Shimako Satō
Tokyo Metropolitan Police Department in fiction
Japanese action films
Japanese sequel films
2010s Japanese films